Yasmin Daji (born 1947) is an Indian doctor, model and beauty pageant titleholder. She was crowned Femina Miss India 1966. She represented India at Miss Universe 1966, where she was crowned 3rd Runner Up.

Early life and education
She was born in 1947 in New York City. She moved to Delhi, India and entered Lady Hardinge medical college.

Pagentry

Femina Miss India 1966 
She was studying medical science in Lady Hardinge Medical College (LHMC), New Delhi  when she entered Femina Miss India pageant in 1966. She was crowned the eventual winner. She also won Miss Beautiful Smile sub-award at the said pageant.

Miss Universe 1966 
She represented India at Miss Universe 1966 pageant and was declared 3rd Runner Up.

In Media and Life after Miss Universe 1966 
After becoming Miss Universe 3rd runner up, she became a very prominent and well known face in India. She was the face of the famous Lure cosmetics in India. She became one of the most beautiful women in the Indian modelling industry. She was also mentioned in the famous book Pride of India by Persis Khambatta.

Personal life
After completing her reign as Miss India Universe and finishing her studies she returned to the United States and got married. She has two sons.

References

1947 births
Femina Miss India winners
Living people
Miss Universe 1966 contestants
Physicians from New York City